Dowdy–Ficklen Stadium  is the on-campus football facility at East Carolina University for the East Carolina Pirates in Greenville, North Carolina. The official capacity of the stadium is 51,000, tying it for the second largest college stadium in North Carolina. The record attendance for the stadium was on September 3, 2022, against the North Carolina State University with 51,711 in attendance. The stadium is also the site of Spring Commencement exercises for the university. The field itself was commemorated as Bagwell Field in 1997.

History

Original construction
The initiative to build a new stadium was announced on October 7, 1961.  On that day,  President Leo Jenkins announced to a meeting of boosters, that a new stadium will be built to replace College Stadium.  By 1962, over $280,000 was raised and Ficklen Memorial Stadium was built.  The stadium was named for James Skinner Ficklen, the owner of Greenville's E.B. Skinner Tobacco Company.  Skinner was a booster of the college, and established a scholarship fund in his name.  The original stadium included permanent stands on the south side, a press box, and a lighting system.  Ficklen Memorial Stadium opened on September 21, 1963 with a win against Wake Forest.  The original seating capacity was 10,000.

Early expansions
The north side permanent seating was constructed in 1967 and 1968, increasing the capacity of the stadium to 20,000.  The seats were designed by W.M. Freeman Associates from High Point.  The exterior of the stadium was painted in 1970 by F.A. Miller Company.  The lighting system was the next item that changed.  The original lighting system was replaced with six towers outside of the stadium in 1975.  The cost of the new lighting system was $450,000.  L.E. Wooten company built the lighting system.

The next addition occurred two years later.  The university added seats to the four corners increased the seating capacity to 35,000.  This addition made Ficklen Memorial Stadium the third largest stadium in North Carolina. The expansion was funded by a $2.5 million drive in the spring of 1977.  A three story press box was built as part of this expansion. The press box, which had space for 92 writers and an entire floor for electronic media, was in use until 2018 when it was replaced by the much larger Townbank Tower. Lastly, scoreboard with a lightbank message center was placed on the east end of the stadium. The playing surface was redone in 1983.  A new drainage system, new base of gravel and sand, new treated topsoil, and a new grass—Tifton 419 Hybrid Bermuda were all installed.  A new sound system was built in 1988.

1990s expansions

In 1991, $1.6 million in renovations and repairs were accomplished on the stadium.

Ronald and Mary Ellen Dowdy of Orlando, Florida, donated $1 million during a fund-raising drive in 1994.  Because of this donation, Ficklen Memorial Stadium was renamed Dowdy–Ficklen Stadium.  Also that year the roads were improved around the stadium.  3 years later, Al and Debbie Bagwell of Lake Gaston, Virginia donated to the East Carolina Educational Foundation.  Because of this donation, the field inside the stadium was named Bagwell Field.

The upper deck on the north side was completed in 1998. It increased the capacity to 40,000. This was the first seating capacity increase since 1977. A year later the club level on the north side was completed. It added 3,000 seats to the total capacity. During the expansion of the upper deck and club level, the press box received improvements. In 1999, a $2 million scoreboard was built in the east endzone. Also that year a Pirate sculpture was dedicated in the southeast area of the stadium. Irwin Belk gave the sculpture to the school. Jodi Hollnagel, a faculty member of the School of Art created the sculpture.

Murphy Center construction

The $13 million Murphy Center was dedicated on September 13, 2002.  It was built in the west endzone of the stadium.  It connects the stadium to Williams Arena at Minges Coliseum.  The  strength and conditioning, banquet rooms, sport memorabilia, and an academic enhancement center building was named for Pete and Lynn Murphy of Rose Hill.

2009–2010 expansion
The next expansion began in December 2009. The expansion included removing the scoreboard located in the east end zone. 7,000 seats were built in its place. The seats connect the north and south sides in a horseshoe pattern. Those seats increased the capacity to 50,000. Restroom and concession stands were built under the new section. Above the east end zone, a new scoreboard was built. This makes the new scoreboard the 22nd largest scoreboard in NCAA Football Bowl Subdivision. On the north and south sides of the stadium, 10,200 chair-back seats were installed. Lastly,  another scoreboard was built on the west end zone in front of the Murphy Center. The total cost of the expansion was $20 million.

2018–2019 renovation project
In May 2016, East Carolina revealed a $60 million renovation project for Dowdy–Ficklen Stadium, which is a portion of its athletic facilities master plan.

The project, which is slated to begin construction after the 2017 football season and was to be completed in time for the 2018 football season, has been extended to a 16-18 month construction period. In April 2019, TowneBank donated $3 million toward the renovation for naming rights. The renovation includes:

 A four-story tower above the south general admission seats which will add than 1,000 premium seats through the addition of a new Club Level, Loge Boxes, and Suites.
 A new field-level Club Section at the Murphy Center
 A modern press box with additional space for media, including amended radio and television broadcast and production locations.
 Improvements to the Ward Sports Medicine Building and Scales Field House to provide needed functional space for student-athletes.

TowneBank Tower officially opened in August 2019 and includes 19 skyboxes, four founder suites, 22 loge boxes, 530 club seats, and more than 100 media seats.

Marshall University plane crash
On November 14, 1970, the visiting Marshall University Thundering Herd lost a game 17-14 to the Pirates at Dowdy–Ficklen Stadium, which ended with Marshall quarterback Ted Shoebridge controversially being called for intentional grounding on the last play of the game.  Later that evening, while on approach to Huntington Tri-State Airport, the Marshall football team's plane, which had been chartered to transport the Thundering Herd to and from Greenville, crashed, killing all 75 people on board.

On December 11, 2006, a plaque was erected at the visitors' entrance to Dowdy–Ficklen Stadium.  It depicts the memorial fountain on the Marshall University campus.

Attendance

List of average attendance

Top 15 attended games

Photographs of Dowdy-Ficklen Stadium

See also
 List of NCAA Division I FBS football stadiums

References

External links

 Dowdy-Ficklen Stadium from ECU Pirates.com

College football venues
East Carolina Pirates football
American football venues in North Carolina
Sports venues in Pitt County, North Carolina
1963 establishments in North Carolina
Sports venues completed in 1963